Lars Martin Hansson (born 12 March 1975, Frösön) is a Swedish former alpine skier who competed in the 1998 Winter Olympics and in the 2006 Winter Olympics. He was Swedish national junior slalom champion in 1994. He is the younger brother of fellow alpine skier Erika Hansson.

References

1975 births
Swedish male alpine skiers
Alpine skiers at the 1998 Winter Olympics
Alpine skiers at the 2006 Winter Olympics
Olympic alpine skiers of Sweden
People from Frösön
Living people
Sportspeople from Jämtland County
21st-century Swedish people